Ronald Reagan Washington National Airport , sometimes referred to colloquially as National Airport, Washington National, Reagan National, DCA, Reagan, or simply National, is an airport in Arlington County, Virginia, across the Potomac River from Washington, D.C. It is the smaller of two airports operated by the Metropolitan Washington Airports Authority (MWAA) that serve the Washington metropolitan area around Washington, D.C.; the larger is Dulles International Airport about  to the west in Fairfax and Loudoun counties.

The airport opened in 1941 and was originally named Washington National Airport. Part of the original terminal is still in use as Terminal 1. A larger second terminal, now known as Terminal 2, opened in 1997. In 1998, Congress passed, and President Bill Clinton signed, a bill renaming it Ronald Reagan National Airport in honor of President Ronald Reagan. MWAA operates the airport with close oversight by the federal government due to its proximity to the national capital.

Planes are required to take unusually complicated paths to avoid restricted and prohibited airspace above sensitive landmarks, government buildings, and military installations in and around Washington, D.C., and comply with some of the tightest noise restrictions in the country.

Reagan National currently serves 91 nonstop destinations and is a hub for American Airlines. Although technically an international airport, it has no immigration and customs facilities. Therefore, it is used predominantly for domestic flights with the only internationals being to and from those with U.S. Customs and Border Protection preclearance facilities, including major airports in Canada and some destinations in the Caribbean. International passenger flights to and from the Washington metropolitan area typically utilize Washington Dulles International Airport or Baltimore/Washington International Airport.

The airport served 23.5 million passengers in 2018. In 2019, DCA served 23,945,527 passengers, an increase of 1.8% over 2018 and a new passenger record for the airport.

History

20th century

The first airport in the area was Arlington's Hoover Field, which opened in 1926. Near the present site of The Pentagon, its single runway was crossed by a street; guards had to stop automobile traffic during takeoffs and landings. The following year, in 1927, Washington Airport, another privately operated field, began service next door. In 1930, the Great Depression led the two terminals to merge to form Washington-Hoover Airport. Bordered on the east by U.S. Route 1, with its accompanying high-tension electrical wires, and obstructed by a high smokestack on one approach and a dump nearby, the field was inadequate.

The need for a better airport was acknowledged in 37 studies conducted between 1926 and 1938, but a statute prohibited federal development of airports. When Congress lifted the prohibition in 1938, President Franklin D. Roosevelt made a recess appropriation of $15 million to build National Airport by reallocating funds from other purposes. Construction of Washington National Airport began in 1940–1941 by a company led by John McShain. Congress challenged the legality of FDR's recess appropriation, but construction of the new airport continued.

The airport is located southwest of Washington, D.C. in the Crystal City section of Arlington County, Virginia. The western part of the airport was once within a large Virginia plantation, a remnant of which is now inside a historic site near the airport's Metrorail station.

The airport opened June 16, 1941, just before U.S. entry into World War II. The public was entertained by displays of wartime equipment including a captured Japanese Zero war prize flown in with U.S. Navy colors. In 1945 Congress passed a law that established the airport was legally within Virginia, mainly for liquor sales taxation purposes, but under the jurisdiction of the federal government. On July 1 of that year the airport's weather station became the official point for D.C. weather observations and records by the National Weather Service, in Washington, D.C.

Until 1946, nonstop airline flights did not reach beyond New York City, Detroit, Cincinnati, Memphis, Atlanta, and Jacksonville. In 1946, Boston, Chicago, Dallas, and Miami were added; nonstops reached Denver in 1951 and Los Angeles in 1954. The April 1957 Official Airline Guide shows 316 weekday departures: 95 Eastern (plus six per week to/from South America), 77 American, 61 Capital, 23 National, 17 TWA, 10 United, 10 Delta, 6 Allegheny, 6 Braniff, 5 Piedmont, 3 Northeast and 3 Northwest. Jet flights began in April 1966 (727-200s were not allowed until 1970). In 1974 the airport's key carriers were Eastern (20 destinations), United (14 destinations after subsuming Capital) and Allegheny (11 destinations).

The grooving of runway 18–36 to improve traction when wet, in March 1967, was the first at a civil airport in the United States.

Service to the airport's Metro station began in 1977.

The Washington National Airport Terminal and South Hangar Line were listed on the National Register of Historic Places in 1997.

Expansion and restrictions
The runway layout has changed little since the 1956 closure of the east–west runway at the south end of the field. Changes to the terminal complex over the years include:
 Extension of the original Main Terminal (today's Terminal 1) to the south in 1950
The construction of a North Terminal supplemented the original terminal in 1958; construction connected the two terminals in 1961.
 A United Airlines holdroom complex was built in 1965, a facility for American Airlines was completed in 1968, and a facility for Northwest Airlines and TWA (still in use today as the Terminal A concourse), along with a commuter terminal in 1970.
The Metrorail station serving the Airport opened in 1977.
 A major terminal expansion including a new air traffic control tower, officially called Terminals B/C, opened in 1997 giving the terminal its current configuration.
 Runways 18/36 and 3/21 were renumbered as 1/19 and 4/22 in 1999 as earth's magnetic field drifted.
 In March 2012 the main 1/19 runway was lengthened  to add FAA compliant runway safety runoff areas.

Despite the expansions, efforts have been made to restrict the growth of the airport. The advent of jets and traffic growth led Congress to pass the Washington Airport Act of 1950, which led to the opening of Dulles International Airport in 1962. To reduce congestion and drive traffic to alternative airports, the FAA imposed perimeter restrictions on National when jets arrived in 1966, and landing slot at DCA and four other high-density airports in 1969.

The airport originally had no perimeter rule; from 1954 to 1960, piston-engine airliners flew nonstop to California. Scheduled jet airliners were not allowed until April 1966, and concerns about aviation noise led to noise restrictions even before jet service began in 1966.

The perimeter rule was implemented in January 1966 as a voluntary agreement by airlines, to get permission to use short-haul jets at National. Dulles was to continue to serve the long haul markets, limiting traffic and noise at National; the FAA assumed that ground level noise would be reduced because planes would take off light on fuel and be up and away quickly. The spirit of the agreement was regularly violated as flights left National to an airport within the perimeter and then immediately took off for a destination beyond it. Overcrowding at National was later managed by the 1969 High Density Rule, thereby removing one of the justifications for the perimeter agreement.

In the 1960s and 1970s, several attempts were made to codify the perimeter rule, but it was not until Dulles was endangered that it actually become a strict rule. In 1970 the FAA lifted the ban at National of the stretched Boeing 727-200, which resulted in a lawsuit by Virginians for Dulles who argued that the airport's jet traffic was a nuisance. That suit resulted in a Court of Appeals order to create an Environmental Impact Statement (EIS). In addition to the court order, there were economic problems at Dulles. Following the extension of Metrorail to National in 1977, and airline deregulation in 1978, traffic at Dulles began to plummet while it increased at National. As part of a slate of efforts to protect Dulles, including removing landing fees and mobile lounge user charges, the FAA proposed regulations as part of the EIS to limit traffic at National and maintain Dulles's role as the area's airport for long-haul destinations. In 1980, the FAA proposed codifying the perimeter rule as part of a larger rulemaking effort. When the rule was announced, airlines challenged it in court; the Metropolitan Washington Airports Policy of 1981 codified the perimeter rule on an interim basis "to maintain the long-haul nonstop service at Dulles and BWI which otherwise would preempt shorter haul service at National." At the same time, the perimeter was extended to  miles to remove the unfairness of having seven grandfathered cities. The perimeter rule was upheld by the Court of Appeals in 1982.

Slots at the airport have been traded in several instances. In 2011 US Airways acquired a number of Delta's slots at National in exchange for Delta receiving a number of US Airways slots at LaGuardia Airport in New York. JetBlue paid $40 million to acquire eight slot pairs at auction in the same year. JetBlue and Southwest acquired 12 and 27 US Airways slot pairs, respectively, in 2014 as part of a government-mandated divestiture following the merger of US Airways and American.

Flights normally use Runway 1/19 (7169' x 150' / 2185 m x 46 m), as the shorter Runways 15/33 and 4/22 can accommodate them only under very windy conditions.

Transfer of control and renaming
In 1984, the Secretary of Transportation Elizabeth Dole appointed a commission to study transferring National and Dulles Airports from the Federal Aviation Administration (FAA) to a local entity, which could use airport revenues to finance improvements. The commission recommended that one multi-state agency administer both Dulles and National, over the alternative of having Virginia control Dulles and the District of Columbia control National. In 1987 Congress, through legislation, transferred control of the airport from the FAA to the new Metropolitan Washington Airports Authority with the Authority's decisions being subject to a Congressional review panel. The constitutionality of the review panel was later challenged in the Supreme Court and the Court has twice declared the oversight panel unconstitutional. Even after this decision, however, Congress has continued to intervene in the management of the airports.

On February 6, 1998, President Bill Clinton signed legislation changing the airport's name from Washington National Airport to Ronald Reagan Washington National Airport, to honor the former president on his 87th birthday. The legislation was drafted against the wishes of MWAA officials and political leaders in Northern Virginia and Washington, D.C. Opponents of the renaming argued that a large federal office building had already been named for Reagan, the Ronald Reagan Building and International Trade Center, and that the airport was already named for George Washington, the first United States president. 

The bill stated that it did not require the expenditure of any funds to accomplish the name change; however, state, regional, and federal authorities were later required to change highway and transit signs at their own additional expense as new signs were made.

21st century
In 2015, The Express conducted an online survey asking people what they call “the airport in Northern Virginia that’s not Dulles." The results found that only 31% of people referred to the airport as "Reagan" and only 12% as "Reagan National", compared to 57% dropping the former president from the name. Political preference was shown to have a direct correlation with how people called the airport, with 72% of Republicans referring to the airport using "Reagan," while 64% of Democrats call it "National" or "DCA." Given that Washington, D.C., is one of the most Democratic cities in the United States, the dominant name does not feature the name "Reagan".

Construction of current terminal buildings

With the addition of more flights and limited space in the aging main terminal, the airport began an extensive renovation and expansion in the 1990s. Hangar 11 on the northern end of the airport was converted into The USAir Interim Terminal, designed by Joseph C. Giuliani, FAIA. Soon after an addition for Delta Air Lines was added in 1989 and was later converted to Authority offices. These projects allowed for the relocation of several gates in the main terminal until the new $450 million terminal complex became operational. On July 27, 1997, the new terminal complex, Terminal 2, and two parking garages, opened. Argentine architect César Pelli designed the new terminals of the airport. The Interim Terminal closed immediately after its opening and was converted back into a hangar. One pier of the main terminal (now widely known as Terminal A), which mainly housed American Airlines and Pan Am, was demolished; the other pier, originally designed by Giuliani Associates Architects for Northwest and TWA remains operational today as gates A1–A9.

Operations

Perimeter restrictions

Reagan National Airport is subject to a federally mandated perimeter limitation to keep it a "short-haul" airport and to keep most "long-haul" air traffic to Dulles International Airport. Congress and the United States Department of Transportation have created many "beyond-perimeter" exceptions that have weakened the rule.

Members of Congress repeatedly have sought to extend the limit and permit exceptions in order to allow nonstop service from National Airport to their home states and districts. In 1999, Senator John McCain of Arizona introduced legislation to remove the  restriction. In the end the restriction was not lifted, but in 2000 the FAA was permitted to add 24 exemptions, which went to Alaska Airlines for flights to Seattle–Tacoma International Airport. America West later obtained exemptions for non-stop flights to Phoenix in 2004. In May 2012, the DOT granted new exemptions for Alaska to serve Portland, JetBlue to serve San Juan, Southwest to serve Austin and Virgin America to serve San Francisco. American, Delta, United and US Airways were also each allowed to exchange a pair of in-perimeter slots for an equal number of beyond-perimeter slots.

Approach patterns

Reagan National Airport has some of the strictest noise restrictions in the country. Due to these restrictions, pilots approaching from the north are generally required to follow the path of the Potomac River and turn just before landing. This approach is known as the River Visual. Similarly, flights taking off to the north are required to climb quickly and turn left.

There are lights on the Key Bridge, Theodore Roosevelt Bridge, Arlington Memorial Bridge and the George Mason Memorial Bridge to aid pilots following the river. Aircraft using the approach can be observed from various parks on the river's west bank. Passengers on the left side of an airplane can see the Capitol, the Washington Monument, the Lincoln Memorial, the Jefferson Memorial, the World War II Memorial, Georgetown University, the National Mall, portions of Downtown Washington, D.C. (including the roof of Capital One Arena), and the White House. Passengers on the right side can see CIA headquarters, Arlington National Cemetery, the Pentagon, eastern Arlington, including portions of Rosslyn, Clarendon, Ballston, Crystal City, and the United States Air Force Memorial.

When the River Visual is not available due to visibility or winds, aircraft may fly an offset localizer or GPS approach to Runway 19 along a similar course (flying a direct approach course on instruments as far as Rosslyn, and then turning to align with the runway visually moments before touchdown). Most airliners are also capable of performing a VOR or GPS approach to the shorter Runway 15/33. Northbound visual and ILS approaches to Runway 1 are also sometimes used; these approaches follow the Potomac River from the south and overfly the Woodrow Wilson Bridge.

Special security measures
In 1938, Franklin D. Roosevelt issued Executive Order No. 7910, creating the first restricted airspace around the District of Columbia. This would be superseded by a number of executive orders clarifying the boundaries of the airspace until 1966, when it was codified into Title 14, Code of Federal Regulations, part 73. Title 14 created Prohibited Airspace 56 A and B (P-56A and P-56B). P-56A restricted flight around the National Mall, White House, and United States Capitol Building, while P-56B restricted flight in a half-mile radius from the center of the U.S. Naval Observatory. Only aircraft supporting the United States Secret Service, Office of the President, or some government agencies are permitted within the prohibited airspace.

In the aftermath of the September 11, 2001, attacks, a Flight-Restricted Zone (FRZ) was put into effect. Extending 15 approximately nautical miles (or roughly 17 miles) around the airport, only scheduled commercial flights and governmental flights are allowed into the zone without a waiver from the Federal Aviation Administration. Charter flights for the U.S. government are permitted to land at the airport and Joint Base Andrews under certain conditions.

After the September 11 attacks, the airport was closed for several weeks, and security was tightened when it reopened. Increased security measures included:
 A ban on aircraft with more than 156 seats (lifted in April 2002)
 A ban on the "River Visual" approach (lifted in April 2002)
 A requirement that, 30 minutes prior to landing or following takeoff, passengers were required to remain seated; if anyone stood up, the aircraft was to be diverted to Washington Dulles International Airport under military escort and the person standing would be detained and questioned by federal law enforcement officials (lifted in July 2005)
 A ban on general aviation (lifted in October 2005, subject to the restrictions below)
On October 18, 2005, National Airport was reopened to general aviation on a limited basis (48 operations per day) and under restrictions: passenger and crew manifests must be submitted to the Transportation Security Administration 24 hours in advance, and all planes must pass through one of roughly 70 "gateway airports" where re-inspections of aircraft, passengers, and baggage take place. An armed security officer must be on board before departing a gateway airport. On March 23, 2011, the air traffic control supervisor on duty reportedly fell asleep during the night shift. Two aircraft on approach to the airport were unable to contact anyone in the control tower and landed unassisted.

Terminals and facilities

DCA has 59 gates with jetways: 9 gates in Terminal 1 and 51 gates in Terminal 2 (13 gates in Concourse B, 12 in Concourse  C, 11 in Concourse D and 14 in the new Concourse E). The two terminals are not connected to each other post-security.
A new terminal and gate numbering scheme was implemented in 2022. Previously Terminal 1 was Terminal A, and Terminal 2 was Terminal B/C, as it is one building. All gates also now have a letter, A through E for each of the five concourses. Therefore, Gate 33 became Gate C33. Other changes include B Parking and C Parking, becoming Parking 2 South and Parking 2 North.

Terminal 1

Designed by architect Charles M. Goodman, terminal 1 opened in 1941 and was expanded in 1955 to accommodate more passengers and airlines. The exterior of this terminal has had its original architecture restored, with the airside façade restored in 2004 and the landside façade restored in 2008. The terminal underwent a $37 million renovation that modernized the airport's look by bringing in brighter lighting, more windows, and new flooring. The project was completed in 2014 along with a new expanded TSA security checkpoint. In 2014, additional renovations were announced including new upgraded concessions and further structural improvements, the project was completed in 2015. Terminal 1 contains gates A1–A9 and houses operations from Air Canada Express, Frontier, and Southwest, with Southwest having the largest presence in Terminal 1.

Terminal 2

Terminal 2 is the airport's newest and largest terminal; the terminal opened in 1997 and replaced a collection of airline-specific terminals built during the 1960s. The new terminal (Concourses B-D) was designed by architect Cesar Pelli and house 35 gates. The terminal is directly connected to the WMATA airport station via indoor pedestrian bridges. Concourse E, which expanded Terminal 2, opened in 2021 as a replacement for Gate 35X, which was a bus gate.

Terminals 2 has four concourses. Concourse B (gates B10–B22) houses Alaska Airlines, Delta, and United. Concourse C (gates C23–C34) houses American and JetBlue. Concourse D (gates D35–D45) is exclusive to American for their hub at DCA along with Concourse E (gates E46–E59). The corridor/hall connecting the four concourses of Terminal 2 is known as National Hall. Concourse B houses a Delta Sky Club and United Club, and there are three American Admirals Clubs in Terminal 2. The Delta Sky Club was renovated in summer 2018.

Lounges
There are currently six airport lounges at the airport in all the Terminals. There are three American Airlines Admirals Clubs: one near gate C24 in concourse C, one in concourse D near gate D36, and one in Concourse E near gate E47. In concourse B there is a Delta Sky Club near gate B15, and a United Club near gate B10. In Terminal 1 there is a USO lounge for retired and active military members pre-security. Originally scheduled for 2022, an American Express Centurion Lounge is scheduled to open in terminal 2 in 2023 by door 1 on the ticketing level. A Capital One lounge is also scheduled to open in 2023.

Project Journey 
MWAA began construction of a new concourse north of Terminal 2 in February 2018 to accommodate 14 new regional jet gates with jetways, bringing the total number of gates at DCA to 60. This replaced "Gate 35X," a bus gate formerly used to bring passengers to and from American Eagle flights that used parking spots on the ramp. Officially called Project Journey, construction was completed on April 20, 2021.

In addition, the individual security checkpoints for the four concourses in Terminal 2 were replaced with higher-capacity security checkpoints in two new buildings to the west of National Hall, located next to the two Metro station pedestrian bridges, and in between the two existing arrivals and departures roadways, placing all of National Hall within the secured area of the airport and allowing passengers to walk between concourses without re-clearing security. The new checkpoints were opened on November 9, 2021.

Ground transportation
The Ronald Reagan Washington National Airport station on the Washington Metro, served by the Yellow and Blue lines, is located on an elevated outdoor platform station adjacent to Terminal 2. Two elevated pedestrian walkways connect the station directly to the concourse levels of Terminal 2. An underground pedestrian walkway and shuttle services provide access to Terminal 1.

Metrobus provides service on weekend mornings before the Metro station opens or during any disruptions to regular Metro service.

Ronald Reagan Washington National Airport is located on the George Washington Memorial Parkway, and connected to U.S. Route 1 by the Airport Viaduct (State Route 233). Interstate 395 is just north of the airport, and is also accessible by the G.W. Parkway and U.S. Route 1. Airport-operated parking garage facilities as well as economy lots are available adjacent to or near the various airport terminals.

The airport is accessible by bicycle and foot from the Mount Vernon Trail, as well as the sidewalk along the Airport Viaduct (State Route 233), which connects the airport grounds to U.S. Route 1. A total of 48 bike parking spots are available across six separate bike racks. The airport has a Capital Bikeshare station, making this the first major airport in the United States to have a dock-based bikeshare station.

Airlines and destinations

Statistics

Top destinations

Airline market share

Annual traffic

Abingdon plantation historical site
A part of the airport is located on the former site of the 18th and 19th century Abingdon plantation, which was associated with the prominent Alexander, Custis, Stuart, and Hunter families. In 1998, MWAA opened a historical display around the restored remnants of two Abingdon buildings and placed artifacts collected from the site in an exhibit hall in Terminal A. The Abingdon site is located on a knoll between parking Garage A and Garage B/C, near the south end of the Ronald Reagan Washington National Airport Metrorail station.

Accidents and incidents

Page Airways
On April 27, 1945, a Page Airways Lockheed Model 18 Lodestar (flight # unknown) bound for New York, (airport unknown) crashed into a deep ditch at the end of runway 33 after aborting a takeoff due to engine failure. There were strong gusts and ground turbulence at the time. Out of the 13 passengers and crew on board, six passengers were killed.

Eastern Air Lines Flight 537

On November 1, 1949, a mid-air collision between an Eastern Air Lines passenger aircraft and a P-38 Lightning military plane took the lives of 55 passengers. The sole survivor was the Bolivian ace pilot of the fighter plane, Erick Rios Bridoux.

Bridoux's plane had taken off from National just 10 minutes earlier and was in contact with the tower during a brief test flight. The Eastern Air Lines DC-4 was on approach from the south when the nimble and much faster P-38 banked and plunged right into the passenger plane. Both aircraft dropped into the Potomac River.

Capital Airlines Flight 500
On December 12, 1949, Capital Airlines Flight 500, a Douglas DC-3, stalled and crashed into the Potomac River while on approach to Washington National. Six of the 23 passengers and crew on board were killed.

Air Florida Flight 90

On the afternoon of January 13, 1982, following a period of exceptionally cold weather and a morning of blizzard conditions, Air Florida Flight 90 crashed after waiting forty-nine minutes on a taxiway and taking off with ice and snow on the wings. The Boeing 737 aircraft failed to gain altitude. Rescue responses were greatly hampered by the weather and traffic. Due to action on the part of motorists, a United States Park Service police helicopter crew, and one of the plane's passengers who later died, five occupants of the downed plane survived. The other 74 people who were aboard died, as well as four occupants of vehicles on the bridge. President Reagan cited motorist Lenny Skutnik in his State of the Union Address a few weeks later.

References

External links

Airport Map Metropolitan Washington Airports Authority. June 2011
Historic American Engineering Record documentation:

KDCA - Ronald Reagan Washington National Airport at airnav.com

 
1941 establishments in Virginia
Aircraft hangars on the National Register of Historic Places
Airfields of the United States Army Air Forces Air Transport Command in North America
Airfields of the United States Army Air Forces in Virginia
Airports established in 1941
Airports in Virginia
Airports on the National Register of Historic Places
Historic American Engineering Record in Virginia
Monuments and memorials to Ronald Reagan
Metropolitan Washington Airports Authority
National Register of Historic Places in Arlington County, Virginia
Transportation buildings and structures on the National Register of Historic Places in Virginia
Transportation in Arlington County, Virginia
Airports in the Washington metropolitan area